Stephen Herbert Perrin (January 22, 1946 – August 13, 2021) was an American game designer and technical writer/editor, best known for creating the tabletop role-playing game RuneQuest for Chaosium.

Early life and education
Perrin earned a Bachelor of Arts in English from San Francisco State University. In 1966, Perrin was a founding member of the Society for Creative Anachronism (SCA).

Early career and Chaosium

One of his first contributions to the world of RPGs was "The Perrin Conventions" in 1976, a set of alternative rules for Dungeons & Dragons combat, which led to his work on RuneQuest. Perrin was interested in getting more involved with the RPG industry, and with Jeff Pimper he talked with Chaosium about publishing a D&D-based monster manual, which they called All the Worlds' Monsters (1977), which beat TSR's Monster Manual to market. Perrin - along with Steve Henderson and Warren James - began working on an idea for an original gaming system for Glorantha, and were soon joined by Ray Turney from the original failed design team; this was finally published in 1978 as RuneQuest.

Perrin officially joined Chaosium in 1981, although he just stayed a few years. He was one of several authors who contributed to Thieves' World (1981). Perrin's Worlds of Wonder (1982) was the third release under Chaosium's Basic Role-Playing system (BRP). Superworld, one of Worlds of Wonder'''s worlds, became its own game, although it was only moderately successful and Perrin later acknowledged that it was too similar to Hero Games' Champions. In 1984 he wrote the BRP based Elfquest, based on the Elfquest comic book. While at Chaosium he also created Stormbringer,  and contributed to Call of Cthulhu.

Later career
Hero Games published its sixth RPG, Robot Warriors (1986), by Perrin. He also wrote the 1987 Champions role-playing game supplement The Voice of Doom.

He worked at Interplay Productions, Maxis, and Spectrum Holobyte, doing game design, playtesting, and writing manuals for such computer games as Mechanized Assault & Exploration, Star Trek: Starfleet Academy, and Descent to Undermountain. He has also worked freelance for many of the major players in the games industry including TSR, FASA, Hero Games, West End Games, and Iron Crown Enterprises.Steve Perrin's Quest Rules (SPQR) was sold independently through Chaos Limited. In 2004, he collaborated with Taldren on Black 9 Ops, which Perrin decided to make available for free.

In 2010, Perrin began creating PDF adventures for the games Icons and Mutants & Masterminds, and completed several scenarios for Vigilance Press and Fainting Goat Press. In 2019, he returned to Chaosium as a creative consultant. In 2020, he contributed to the Wild Cards novel American Hero''.

On August 13, 2021, Chaosium announced Perrin's death.

References

External links 
 Steve Perrin's Worlds of Wonder, Steve Perrin's personal website
 The Perrin Conventions
 Steve Perrin at MobyGames
Advanced Designers & Dragons #54: Giants of the Industry: Steve Perrin

1946 births
2021 deaths
American video game designers
Chaosium game designers
Dungeons & Dragons game designers